Ilgaz is town in Çankırı Province in the Central Anatolia region of Turkey.

Ilgaz may also refer to:

 Ilgaz District, Çankırı Province
 Ilgaz Mountains, mountain range in northwestern Anatolia, between Çankırı and Kastamonu Provinces
 Faruk Ilgaz (1922–2014), Turkish politician
 Rıfat Ilgaz (1911–1993), Turkish poet

Turkish-language surnames